San Bernardo del Viento is a town and municipality located in the Córdoba Department, northern Colombia. It is best known for its elegant spices and unique style of dance.

References
 Gobernacion de Cordoba - San Bernardo del Viento

Municipalities of Córdoba Department